Boško Obradović (born 23 August 1976) is a Serbian politician who is the founder and leader of the right-wing political party Dveri. He was the party's nominee for the 2017 and 2022 presidential elections.

Early life
Obradović was born on 23 August 1976 in Vranići, Čačak, SFR Yugoslavia. He studied philology in the University of Belgrade, where he graduated in 2002 after writing his thesis titled "Miloš Crnjanski and the New Nationalism". In 1999, he and some of his classmates started their own publication, Dveri Srpske ("Serbian Gates" in Serbian). The publication group turned into Srpski sabor Dveri ("The Serbian Assembly of Gates" in Serbian) in 2003, after which it eventually became the political party Dveri in 2011.

Political career
The first election during which Obradović ran for higher office was the 2012 Serbian parliamentary election, where his party won 4.34% of the total national vote. Obradović became the leader of Dveri on 25 June 2015. In the 2016 Serbian parliamentary election, Obradović agreed for Dveri to run in a coalition with the Democratic Party of Serbia, who also ran on a eurosceptic platform. The Dveri-DSS coalition received 5% of the national vote, and so Dveri got into the Serbian parliament for the first time.

2017 presidential campaign
In September 2016, Dveri announced that Obradović would be their candidate for the Serbian presidential election in 2017. Obradović officially started his ground campaign in Čačak on 13 January 2017.

On 3 March 2017, Federica Mogherini visited the Serbian parliament as an envoy of the European Union to discuss Serbia's accession into the European Union. During her speech, Obradović and his party members silently held up signs saying "Serbia does not believe Brussels" written in both English and Serbian. This was in stark contrast to Vojislav Šešelj and the MPs from the Serbian Radical Party, who chanted in protest throughout Mogherini's speech. After the speech, Obradović suggested that he thought the chanting was secretly agreed in advanced as a political stunt between Šešelj and Prime Minister Vučić.

On 28 March 2017, Obradović attended a protest on pensions after being invited by pensioners due to their state-mandated pension reductions. One of Obradović's opponents in the presidential race, Vuk Jeremić, also attended the protest. The next day, he traveled to Germany, where he was invited to visit the parliament of Baden-Württemberg by Jörg Meuthen from the political party Alternative for Germany. In return, Obradović invited Meuthen to visit Serbia as a guest of Dveri.

Obradović placed sixth overall out of the eleven candidates in the presidential election, recording 2.29% of the national vote. After the election, he stated that he was unsatisfied with the results, and that the elections should be held again due to irregularities.

Political positions

Foreign policy

Republika Srpska
After the referendum on whether or not Republika Srpska should have its own holiday, Obradović articulated his support for Republika Srpska in an interview with an online YouTube channel Balkan Info which was organized on 18 September 2016. He explained that he would welcome Republika Srpska gaining independence from Bosnia and Herzegovina and subsequently uniting with Serbia. In a later interview with Pravda, Obradović said that the unification of Republika Srpska and Serbia should take the form of a confederacy.

In June 2016, Obradović rejected the "Proposal for a Resolution on Genocide in Srebrenica" in the Serbian parliament, which suggested that July 11 become a national memorial day for the Srebrenica massacre. His party issued a statement regarding the Srebrenica massacre, saying that "genocide did not happen in Srebrenica."

Montenegro
In an interview with Pravda, Obradović criticized Aleksandar Vučić for arresting 18 Serbian citizens who allegedly participated in the 2015-16 Montenegrin protests, saying that Vučić supports Milo Đukanović remaining in power in Montenegro. In both interviews with Pravda and Balkan Info, Obradović suggested that a referendum in Montenegro should be held on re-unification with Serbia.

Social issues

LGBT rights
Shortly after his party entered parliament for the first time in 2016, Obradović was invited to support the Gay Parade in Belgrade on 18 September 2016. However he publicly declined the invitation and denounced the parade, stating that "sexual orientation is not a human right". Obradović attended his party's counter-march to the Gay Parade, called the "Family Walk". In March 2017, a human rights organization called DA SE ZNA ("Let it be known" in Serbian) sent questionnaires to all 11 of the presidential candidates of the 2017 Serbian presidential election, and Obradović was one of five candidates who responded. In his response, Obradović said that he believed that the LGBT community in Serbia enjoy the same rights as other citizens. He said that he considered sexual orientation a private matter, and that it should not be spoken about publicly. When asked about violence against LGBT people, he responded that he condemns every act of violence. However, he did not support gay marriage in the response, and said that neither he nor his party would support the proposed Law on Birth Identity, a proposed law that would expand transgender people's rights.

Military service
In 2015, Obradović argued for returning compulsory military service in Serbia. He referred to military service as "one of the most important schools of life", and added that another crucial reason for returning conscription was so that "men can become men again, so that men won't be slackers but men." The issue of conscription has a historical context in Serbia, since in the state of Yugoslavia required conscription when most adults in Serbia were growing up. From December 10 to 17, 2016, sociologist Srećko Mihailović conducted a nationwide survey with a sample size of 1,200 adults on whether Serbia should return conscription, with the results being that 75% of respondents supported a return of conscription in Serbia.

Personal life
Obradović is married with Julija Obrenović since August 2016 and has three children from his first marriage with Vesna Obradović.

References

External links

 

1976 births
Living people
Politicians from Čačak
Serbian nationalists
University of Belgrade alumni
Candidates for President of Serbia
Members of the National Assembly (Serbia)
Dveri politicians